The 1923 All-Ireland Senior Football Championship was the 37th staging of Ireland's premier Gaelic football knock-out competition. Dublin were the winners.

Results

Connacht Senior Football Championship

Leinster Senior Football Championship

Munster Senior Football Championship

Ulster Senior Football Championship

All-Ireland Senior Football Championship

Championship statistics

Miscellaneous
 Dublin win the All Ireland title for third year in a row.

References